Executive search (informally called headhunting) is a specialized recruitment service which organizations pay to seek out and recruit highly qualified candidates for senior-level and executive jobs across the public and private sectors, as well as non-profit organizations (e.g., President, Vice-president, CEO, and non-executive-directors). Headhunters may also seek out and recruit other highly specialized and/or skilled positions in organizations for which there is strong competition in the job market for the top talent, such as senior data analysts or computer programmers.

The method usually involves commissioning a third-party organization, typically an executive search firm, but possibly a standalone consultant or consulting firm, to research the availability of suitable qualified candidates working for competitors or related businesses or organizations. Having identified a shortlist of qualified candidates who match the client's requirements, the executive search firm may act as an intermediary to contact the individual(s) and see if they might be interested in moving to a new employer. The executive search firm may also carry out initial screening of the candidate, negotiations on remuneration and benefits, and preparing the employment contract.

In some markets, there has been a move towards using executive search for lower positions, driven by the fact that there are fewer candidates for some positions, even on lower levels than executive.

Executive search firms
An executive search firm is a type of professional service firm that specializes in recruiting executives and other senior personnel for their client companies in various industries. Executive search agents/professionals typically have a wide range of personal contacts in their industry or field of specialty; detailed, specific knowledge of the area; and typically operate at the most senior level of executive positions. Executive search professionals are also involved throughout the hiring process, conducting detailed interviews and presenting candidates to clients selectively, when they feel the candidate meets all stated requirements and would fit into the culture of the hiring firm. Executive search firms typically have long-lasting relationships with clients spanning many years, and in such cases the suitability of candidates is paramount. It is also important that such firms operate with a high level of professionalism and confidentiality.

When corporate entities elect to use an outside executive search firm, it is usually because they lack the internal research resources, professional networks, or evaluative skills to properly recruit for themselves. Using an outside firm also allows the corporate entity the freedom of recruiting from competitors without doing so directly, and the ability to choose among candidates that would not be available through internal or passive sourcing methodologies. Executive search firms are national and international. Many specialize in a particular business industry sector. The contractual relationship between client and executive search firm falls into two broad categories: contingent and retained. Contingent recruiters are paid only upon the successful completion of the "search assignment." Retained recruiters are paid for the process, typically earning a recruiting fee in three stages based on the anticipated compensation of the executive.

In 1959 the Association of Executive Search and Leadership Consultants (AESC) emerged to set the standards of quality and ethics for the executive search consulting trade. AESC Members range in size from large global firms and networks to boutique firms spanning more than 70 countries.

Retained search
High-end executive search firms get a retainer (up-front fee) to perform a specific search for a corporate officer or other senior executive position. Typically, retained searches tend to be for positions that pay upwards of US$150,000 and often far more. Search fees are typically 33.33% of the annual compensation of the recruited executive. Fee payments may be made in thirds, 1/3 of fee paid on initiation of the search, 1/3 paid thirty days later, and the final 1/3 paid thirty days later or upon placement of the candidate. Alternatively, a fixed fee may be established.

Retained search firms provide a guarantee to do an assignment over if the hired candidate leaves before a stated milestone (anywhere from one year to three years), generally with the caveat there has not been a material change in the position requirements or management team. In a retained search, the fee is for the time and expertise of the search firm. The firm is employed to conduct the entire recruitment effort from startup until the candidate has started working. There are many considerations taken into account when organizations determine whether to hire a retained or other type of search firm, including time and financial resources available, goals of the position search (such as diversity factors), and the importance of discretion and confidentiality.

Retained recruiters work for the organizations who are their clients, not for job candidates seeking employment, in some countries, such as the UK, recruiters are not legally permitted to charge candidates.  In the U.S. job candidates may pay an up front retainer to a consulting or career counseling firms to assist them in their job search.  Search firms generally commit to "off-limits" agreements.  These agreements prevent a firm from approaching employees of their current clients as candidates for other clients (for instance, if a headhunter recruits the new CEO into Boeing, they will agree not to recommend Boeing executives to other companies). Since they act as management consultants working in the best interests of the clients for whom they conduct searches, it would be counterproductive to simultaneously remove talented executives from those client companies. Search firms may decline assignments from certain companies, in order to preserve their ability to recruit candidates from those companies. Some large search firms may insist on guarantees of a certain number or dollar value of searches before they will put an entire company "off-limits".

Delimited or engaged search
Another form of high-end executive search, delimited or engaged search, is often improperly categorized as retained search, although there are distinct differences. Similar to retained search firms, delimited/engaged search firms require an up-front fee before engaging the search. Unlike a conventional retainer, however, the delimited/engaged search commitment fee is refundable if the recruiter fails to achieve a hire or other deliverable specified in the contract. Moreover, the delimited/engaged search commitment fee does not follow the typical 1/3, 1/3, 1/3 model of retainers, but rather is a relatively small up-front fee which is discounted from the final placement fee of 25–35% of the successful candidate's first year compensation. Both retained and delimited/engaged searches involve partial payment prior to filling the job, and the contracted recruiter has the search exclusively. Therefore, the search can be customized to the client organization's needs, with the search professional providing a consultative service throughout the process. While both retained and delimited/engaged searches serve client employers rather than job-seeking executives, delimited/engaged search contracts always (as opposed to sometimes) state a future date when the project must be completed or the downpayment refunded.

Contingent search
As stated, contingent search firms are remunerated only upon the successful completion of the search—typically when the candidate accepts the position. These recruiters may earn from 20% to 35% of the candidate's first-year base salary or total remuneration as a hiring fee; the fee may also be calculated to include the candidate's (that is, the successful hire's) median or expected first-year bonus payout. In any case, the fee is (as always) paid by the hiring company, not the candidate/hire. Contingent firms in some markets may quote fees in the range of 12% to 20% as well.

Pros and cons
Clients (companies seeking to hire) often tend to work with contingent search firms when filling mid-level positions. As contingent search firms generally rely heavily on their contacts, and seldom work on an exclusive basis, it is not rare for a client to work with a large number of contingent recruiters on the same search at the same time, in order to maximize the volume of candidate (job seeker) resumes they receive. Beyond the increased volume of candidates that such an approach allows, contingent firms do not get paid until the placement is made (a candidate is successfully hired), and thus the search risk is shifted almost entirely to the search firms. Moreover, contingent search firms often work with clients on higher percentage fee basis, relative to retained and delimited search firms as they shoulder more risk. For senior level roles, clients often prefer to work with recruiters who have performed well in the past for them and usually will end up in the hands of a retained or delimited recruiter.  By working exclusively with one firm on such searches, the client generally develops a much deeper relationship with the recruiter, and receives a much higher level of service. With all methods, retained, delimited, and contingency, clients rely on search professionals to provide not just resumes, but also insightful, consultative information about the market in general, as well as additional tools such as psychometric profiling during the interview process.

A delimited search is often preferred by clients who are seeking a retainer-style service level, while not willing to accept the level of risk that retained search entails. While delimited search does entail up-front fees, they tend to be much smaller than total pre-placement fees that retained search entails. Moreover, delimited search professionals shoulder the risk of their own failure to execute the search within a specified timeframe, offering to refund the up-front fees in such an event. While delimited search is not as desirable for searches that are open-ended in nature, the "ticking clock" is often seen by clients as an incentive that motivates delimited search recruiters to stay more active and involved throughout the hiring process.

See also
 Employment agency
 List of executive search firms
 Onboarding
 Personnel selection
 Recruitment

References

Recruitment
 
Management consulting

pl:Headhunter